Until 2005, these were the boroughs (after the municipality mergers in the 1960s) in the city of Trondheim, Norway:

Sentrum
 Midtbyen
 Øya-Singsaker
 Rosenborg-Møllenberg
 Lademoen
 Lade
 Strindheim
Strinda
 Charlottenlund-Jakobsli
 Ranheim
 Berg-Tyholt
 Åsvang-Stokkan
 Jonsvatnet
 Moholt
Nardo
 Nardo
 Nidarvoll-Leira
 Risvollan-Othilienborg
 Bratsberg
Byåsen
 Ila-Trolla
 Sverresborg
 Byåsen
 Hallset
Heimdal
 Flatåsen-Saupstad
 Heimdal
 Sjetne-Okstad
 Tiller/Tillerbyen
 Kattem
 Byneset-Leinstrand

Trondheim